The White Rose Walk, a 35-mile / 56 km trail located in North Yorkshire, England, was devised in 1968 by the Yorkshire Wayfarers, It starts at the Kilburn White Horse (National Grid Ref SE 514 813) and is completed by touching the trig point on top of Roseberry Topping (NZ 579 126). The walk whilst recognised by the Long Distance Walkers Association (LDWA) as a long distance walk in itself, mixes and crosses with several other long distance paths including the Cleveland Way, the Coast to Coast Walk, and the Lyke Wake Walk. The route takes in the highest peaks in the area such as Live Moor, Carlton Moor, Sutton Bank, Cold Moor, the Wainstones and Urra Moor. The walk also passes Captain Cooks Monument on Easby Moor.

The walk takes in not only stunning scenery with grand views of the Vale of York but also takes the walker through Yorkshire's history, passing by Bronze Age ancient burial mounds, the site of 18th century horse racing and Hambleton Drove Road where cattle were taken to market in Yorkshire, Derbyshire and Lincolnshire by Scottish and Northumbrian drovers.

Walkers who complete the walk within a 24-hour period can claim a woven badge and a small certificate.

Route
 White Horse Kilburn - 	515813	
 View Point Sutton Bank - 	514828	
 Sneck Yate Bank - 		508875	
 High Paradise Farm - 		504887
 Whitestones - 		491931	
 Minor Road - 			479959	
 Picnic area near Moor - 	470993	
 Carlton Bank - 		522030	
 Picnic Area Hasty Bank - 	572035	
 Incline top - Railway - 	611025	
 T - Junction Kildale - 	605092	
 Captain Cook Monument -       590101	
 Roseberry Topping - 	579126
 END T - Junction at Newton - 	571128

Footnotes

Further reading
White, Geoffrey (February 1976). The White Rose Walk in The North York Moors: Special No. 2, Long Distance Walkers Association. pp. 25–30 (A description of the route(s) from 1976 including map )

Footpaths in North Yorkshire
Long-distance footpaths in England